The First Legion is a 1951 American drama film directed by Douglas Sirk and written by Emmet Lavery. The film stars Charles Boyer, William Demarest, Lyle Bettger, Walter Hampden, Barbara Rush, Wesley Addy, H. B. Warner and Leo G. Carroll. The film was released on April 27, 1951, by United Artists. The film was based on Lavery's play of the same name, which opened on Broadway at the 46th Street Theatre on October 1, 1934. The play, which had no female characters, moved to the Biltmore Theater where it closed January 5, 1935.

Plot
Fr. John Fulton, a Jesuit instructor in a seminary school, feels he has lost his vocation.  A talk with his friend Fr. Marc Arnoux is no help.  But on the night he plans to leave the seminary (and the Order) his old teacher Fr. Jose Sierra miraculously gets up and walks, to tell him to stay.  The young, wheelchair-using neighbor Terry Gilmartin regains hope a similar miracle might allow her to walk; her physician, Dr. Peter Morrell, the same one who attended Fr. Sierra, and who is in love with Terry, confesses that he had engineered Sierra's miraculous recovery, to Fr. Arnoux, but refuses his advice to tell the truth.  The Jesuit seminary rector orders Fr. Arnoux to plead the validity of the miracle before the Vatican, in Rome.  When his highly respected subordinate refuses, the rector dies of a heart attack.  At that point Dr. Morrell admits his deception, in particular to Terry, who goes to the seminary chapel and, miraculously, gets out of her wheelchair, at the moment she prays for Dr. Morrell.

Production
The film was financed by Charles Boyer, for whom the original play's character of Father Aherne was renamed to Father Arnoux, to account for Boyer's French accent. Filming took place at the Mission Inn, Riverside, California, during May and June 1950. Director Douglas Sirk had the Spanish Art Gallery at the Inn converted into a seminary common room; bedrooms above the gallery were staged to represent the priests' cells. The St. Francis chapel and atrium, the Mission's original cloister walk, and the monk's music room were also used for filming. The cast and crew, totaling fifty, lived at the Mission Inn while filming. Sound recording was done with magnetic tape, until then a rarity on location.

Cast 
Charles Boyer as Father Marc Arnoux
William Demarest as Monsignor Michael Carey
Lyle Bettger as Dr. Peter Morrell
Walter Hampden as Father Edward Quarterman
Barbara Rush as Terry Gilmartin
Wesley Addy as Father John Fulton
H. B. Warner as Fr. Jose Sierra
Leo G. Carroll as Father Rector Paul Duquesne 	
Taylor Holmes as Father Keene
H. B. Warner as Fr. Jose Sierra
George Zucco as Father Robert Stuart
John McGuire as Father Tom Rawleigh
Clifford Brooke as Brother Clifford
Dorothy Adams as Mrs. Dunn
Molly Lamont as Mrs. Nora Gilmartin
Queenie Smith as Henrietta
Jacqueline deWit as Miss Hamilton
Bill Edwards as Joe

Restoration
The film was restored by the UCLA Film & Television Archive, with funding provided by The Louis B. Mayer Foundation and The Carl David Memorial Fund for Film Preservation; the restoration was publicly screened in March 2015.

References

External links

 
 The First Legion on YT

1951 films
American black-and-white films
United Artists films
1951 drama films
American drama films
Films directed by Douglas Sirk
Articles containing video clips
1950s English-language films
1950s American films
Jesuits